The Presbyterian Church of Wales, also known as Calvinistic Methodist Church, is a denomination of Protestant Christianity in Wales.

The Calvinistic Methodist movement has its origins in the 18th-century Welsh Methodist revival. The early movement was led principally by Welsh revivalist Daniel Rowland, who was influenced by the teachings of the Welsh Methodist leader Howell Harris and the theologian John Calvin. As such, Calvinistic Methodism places a strong emphasis on the sovereignty of God and the Calvinist doctrine of predestination. 

The movement had a profound impact on Welsh society and culture, and it played a significant role in the Welsh revivals of the 19th century. Calvinistic Methodism formerly also had a significant presence in England, under the spiritual leadership of George Whitefield.

History 

The church was born as the Calvinistic Methodists out of the Welsh Methodist revival and the preaching of Howell Harris and Daniel Rowland in the 18th century and seceded from the Church of England in 1811. Calvinistic Methodism became a major denomination in Wales, growing rapidly in the 19th century, and taking a leadership role in the Welsh Religious Revival of 1904-5. In 1823, a Confession of Faith was created and adopted, based on the standard Westminster Confession. Theological colleges for ministerial training were opened in Bala, then in Merionethshire, now Gwynedd (1837), Trefeca, then in Brecknockshire, now Powys (1842), and Aberystwyth, in Ceredigion (1906). It produces a quarterly journal Y Traethodydd and a monthly periodical the Treasury. It is distinguished from other forms of Methodism by the Calvinistic nature of its theology. In 1840, the Foreign Missionary Society was formed in Liverpool to provide missionaries to India. It held its first General Assembly in 1864.

Calvinistic Methodism claims to be the only denomination in Wales to be of purely Welsh origin, owing no influence in its formation to Scottish Presbyterianism. It is also the only denomination to make use of the title Calvinistic (after John Calvin) in its name. In 18th-century England Calvinistic Methodism was represented by the followers of George Whitefield as opposed to those of John and Charles Wesley, although all the early Methodists in England and Wales worked together, regardless of Calvinist or Arminian (or Wesleyan) theology, for many years. With Calvinistic Methodists being absorbed into Presbyterianism, Methodism became defined by its adherence to Wesleyan-Arminian theology.

Beginnings
The movement's beginnings may be traced to Rev. Griffith Jones (1684–1761), Church of England rector of Llanddowror, Carmarthenshire, whose sympathy for the poor led him to set on foot a system of circulating charity schools for the education of children. Griffith Jones's zeal, which contrasted strikingly with the general apathy of the clergy of the period,  appealed to the public imagination, and his powerful preaching exercised a widespread influence. Many travelled long distances in order to attend his ministry. There was thus a considerable number of earnest people dispersed throughout the country waiting for the rousing of the parish clergy.

Daniel Rowland and Howell Harris

Griffith Jones, preaching at Llanddewi Brefi, Cardiganshire found Daniel Rowland (1713–1790), curate of Llangeitho, in his audience, and his patronising attitude in listening drew from the preacher a personal supplication on his behalf in the middle of the discourse. Rowland was deeply moved, and became an ardent apostle of the new movement. Naturally a fine orator, his new-born zeal gave an edge to his eloquence, and his fame spread abroad.

In May 1735 Howell Harris (1714–1773) underwent a religious conversion after listening to a sermon at Talgarth on the necessity of partaking of Holy Communion. This led to several weeks of self-examination and reached a climax at Communion on Whitsunday, May 1735. He immediately began to hold meetings in his own home, encouraging others to seek the same assurance that he had of Christ's forgiveness, and was soon invited to do the same at the houses of others. He became a fiery itinerant preacher, stirring to the depths every neighbourhood he visited. Harris was sent to Oxford in the autumn of 1735 to "cure him of his fanaticism", but he left in the following February.

In 1736, on returning home, Harris opened a school, Griffith Jones supplying him with books from his charity. He also set up societies, in accordance with the recommendations in Josiah Wedgwood's little book on the subject; and these exercised a great influence on the religious life of the people. By far the most notable of Harris's converts was William Williams of Pantycelyn (1717–1791), the famous hymn-writer of Wales, who while listening to the revivalist preaching on a tombstone in the graveyard of Talgarth, felt he was "apprehended as by a warrant from on high". He was ordained deacon in the Church of England, 1740, but George Whitefield recommended him to leave his curacies in order to preach on highways and hedges.

Rowlands and Harris had been at work fully eighteen months before they met in 1737 at a service in Devynock church in the upper part of Breconshire. The acquaintance then formed lasted to the end of Harris's life.

In January 1743 Whitefield chaired a meeting at Plas Watford, near Caerphilly, Glamorgan, attended by Rowland, Williams, Harris, John Humphreys, John Powell — afterwards of Llanmartin – and a layman called John Cennick. They met in order to organise their societies. Seven lay exhorters were also at the meetings; they were questioned as to their spiritual experience and allotted their several spheres; other matters pertaining to the new conditions created by the revival were arranged. This is known as the first Methodist Association, held eighteen months before John Wesley's first conference (June 25, 1744).

Monthly meetings covering smaller districts, were organised to consider local matters, the transactions of which were to be reported to the Quarterly Association, to be confirmed, modified, or rejected. Exhorters were divided into two classes — public, who were allowed to itinerate as preachers and superintend a number of societies; and private, who were confined to the charge of one or two societies. The societies were distinctly understood to be part of the Church of England and every attempt at estranging them from the Church was reproved; but persecution made their position anomalous. They did not accept the discipline of the Church of England, so the plea of conformity was a feeble defence; nor had they taken out licenses, so as to claim the protection of the Toleration Act. Harris's ardent loyalty to the Church of England, after three refusals to ordain him, and his personal contempt for ill-treatment from persecutors, were the only things that prevented separation.

A controversy on a doctrinal point "Did God die on Calvary?" raged for some time, the principal disputants being Rowlands and Harris; and in 1751 it ended in an open rupture, which threw the Connexion first into confusion and then into a state of coma. The societies split up into Harrisites and Rowlandites, and it was only with the revival of 1762 that the breach was fairly repaired. This revival is a landmark in the history of the Connexion.

William Williams Pantycelyn had just published (1744) a little volume of hymns entitled Aleluia, the singing of which inflamed the people. This led the Bishop of St. David's to suspend Rowlands's licence, and Rowlands had to confine himself to a meeting-house at Llangeitho. Having been turned out of other churches, he had leased a plot of land in 1759, anticipating the final withdrawal of his license, in 1763, and a spacious building was erected to which the people crowded from all parts on Sacrament Sunday. Llangeitho became the centre of Welsh Methodism; and Rowland's popularity never waned until his physical powers gave way.

Peter Williams and Thomas Charles
A notable event in the history of Welsh Methodism was the publication in 1770, of a 4th annotated Welsh Bible by the Rev. Peter Williams, a forceful preacher, and an indefatigable worker, who had joined the Methodists in 1746, after being driven from several curacies. It gave birth to a new interest in Scripture, being the first definite commentary in the language. A powerful revival broke out at Llangeitho in the spring of 1780, and spread to the south, but not to the north of Wales.

In North Wales Rev. Thomas Charles (1755–1814) became a major figure. Having spent five years in Somerset as curate of several parishes, Charles returned to his native North Wales to marry Sarah Jones of Bala. Failing to find employment in the established church, he joined the Methodists in 1784. His circulating charity schools and then his Sunday schools gradually made the North a new country. In 1791 a revival began at Bala, a few months after the Bala Association had been ruffled by the proceedings which led to the expulsion of Peter Williams from the Connection, in order to prevent him from selling John Canne's Bible among the Methodists, because of some Sabellian marginal notes. 

In 1790 the Bala Association passed Rules regarding the proper mode of conducting the Quarterly Association, drawn up by Charles; in 1801, Charles and Thomas Jones of Mold, published (for the association) the Rules and Objects of the Private Societies among the People called Methodists. About 1795, persecution led the Methodists to take the first step towards separation from the Church of England. Heavy fines made it impossible for preachers in poor circumstances to continue without claiming the protection of the Toleration Act, and the meeting-houses had to be registered as dissenting chapels. In a large number of cases this had only been delayed by so constructing the houses that they were used both as dwellings and as chapels at one and the same time. Until 1811 the Calvinistic Methodists had no ministers ordained by themselves; their enormous growth in numbers and the scarcity of ministers to administer the Sacrament — only three in North Wales, two of whom had joined only at the dawn of the century made the question of ordination a matter of urgency. The South Wales clergy who regularly itinerated were dying out; the majority of those remaining itinerated but irregularly, and were most of them against the change. The lay element, with the help of Charles and a few other stalwarts, carried the matter through ordaining nine at Bala in June, and thirteen at Llandilo in August. In 1823, the Confession of Faith of the Connextion of Calvinistic Methodists in Wales was published following the Association meetings in Aberystwyth and Bala that year; it is based on the Westminster Confession as Calvinistically construed, and contains 44 articles. The Connection's Constitutional Deed was formally completed in 1826 and tied all its property to the ascension to its Confession of Faith.

Trevecca College
Thomas Charles had tried to arrange for taking over Trevecca College when the trustees of the Countess of Huntingdon's Connexion removed their seminary to Cheshunt in 1791; but the Bala revival broke out just at the time, and, when things grew quieter, other matters pressed for attention. A college had been mooted in 1816, but the intended tutor died suddenly, and the matter was for the time dropped. Candidates for the Connexional ministry were compelled to shift for themselves until 1837, when Lewis Edwards (1809–1887) and David Charles (1812–1878) opened a school for young men at Bala. North and South alike adopted it as their college, the associations contributing a hundred guineas each towards the education of their students. In 1842, the South Wales Association opened a college at Trevecca, leaving Bala to the North; the Rev. David Charles became principal of the former, and the Rev. Lewis Edwards of the latter.  After the death of Dr Lewis Edwards, Dr. T. C. Edwards resigned the principalship of the University College at Aberystwyth to become head of Bala (1891), now a purely theological college, the students of which were sent to the university colleges for their classical training.  In 1905 Mr. David Davies of Llandinam, one of the laymen in the Connection, offered a large building at Aberystwyth as a gift to the denomination for the purpose of uniting North and South in one theological college; but in the event of either association declining the proposal, the other was permitted to take possession, giving the association that should decline the option of joining at a later time. The Association of the South accepted, and that of the North declined, the offer; Trevecca College was turned into a preparatory school on the lines of a similar institution set up at Bala in 1891.

Missions
The missionary collections of the denomination were given to the London Missionary Society from 1798 to 1840, when a Connectional Society was formed; and no better instances of missionary enterprise are known than those of the Khasia and Jaintia Hills, Lushai Hills (Mizoram) and the Plains of Sylhet in northern India. The Presbyterian Church of India is the result of this missionary activity. There had also been a mission in Brittany since 1842.

Constitution
The constitution of the denomination (called in Welsh, Hen Gorff, i.e. the "Old Body" because, at its formation in 1811 issuing from the Anglican Church, it was an established 'body' or Connexion of believers with roots hailing back to the Methodist Revival), is a mixture of Presbyterianism and Congregationalism; each particular society constituted themselves to be churches and manage its own affairs and were to report (I) to the district meeting, (2) to the monthly meeting, the nature of each report determining its destination. The monthly meetings (known now as Presbytery meetings) were, and continue to be made up of all the officers of the churches comprised in each, and are split up into districts for the purpose of a more local co-operation of the churches. The monthly meetings appointed delegates to the quarterly Associations (now bi-annually), of which all officers are members. The Associations of North and South are distinct institutions, deliberating and determining matters pertaining to them in their separate gatherings. For the purpose of a fuller cooperation in matters common to both, a general assembly, which meets once a year, was established in 1864.  This is a purely deliberative conclave, worked by committees, and all its decisions have to be confirmed by the Association meeting in its three provinces before it can have any force. The annual conference of the English churches of the denomination had no decision-making power, and was meant for social and spiritual intercourse and discussion until 1944, when the Association in the East was established with equal standing, forming, together with the North and the South, one Association in three provinces.

Turn of the century
The Calvinistic Methodists formed in some respects the strongest church in Wales, and its Forward Movement, headed by Dr. John Pugh of Cardiff, brought thousands into its fold since its establishment in 1891. Its Connexional Book Room, opened in 1891, yielded an annual profit (at the time) of from £1,600 to £2,000, the profits being devoted to help the colleges and to establish Sunday school libraries, etc. Its chapels in 1907 numbered 1,641 (with accommodation for 488,080), manses 229; its churches numbered 1,428, ministers 921, unordained preachers 318, elders 6,179; its Sunday Schools 1,731, teachers 27,895, scholars 193,460, communicants 189,164, total collections for religious purposes 300,912. The statistics of the Indian Mission (at the time, known now as The Presbyterian Church of India) were equally good: communicants 8,027, adherents 26,787, missionaries 23, native ministers (ordained) 15, preachers (not ordained) 60, and have continued to grow ever since.

According to the Encyclopædia Britannica Eleventh Edition:

Presbyterian Church in Wales
In 1928 it officially adopted the name Presbyterian Church in Wales but still retained the name Welsh Calvinistic Methodism with equal standing. In 1933 its constitution was modified as a result of the Presbyterian Church in Wales Act of Parliament in 1933, receiving Royal assent. In 1947 the Association in the East was established for English-speaking churches. In 1978 Pamela Turner became the first woman to be ordained as a minister. In 2004 the central office moved to Whitchurch, Cardiff. In 2007 new boundaries and structures was adopted for presbyteries. It claims to be the only truly Welsh denomination in Christianity, and is rare among Presbyterian Churches, by originating in the Methodist Revival rather than deriving from the Calvinist Reformation.

Statistics 

The Presbyterian Church of Wales has around 20,000 members who worship in around 620 churches. Most of these churches are in Wales, but due to strong historical links between the Welsh and certain English cities, there are churches using both the English and the Welsh languages in London, Manchester, Birmingham, Coventry and Liverpool.
Churches belong to one of eighteen Presbyteries, grouped into three Provinces, the Association in the South, the Association in the North (Welsh language), and the Association in the East (English language), along with a General Assembly.

The Church offices are located at the Tabernacle Church, 81, Merthyr Road, Whitchurch, Cardiff CF14 1DD.

Social issues 
The church is active in discussing social issues within Wales. In 2014, the church opened up a discussion on whether to bless or recognise same-sex relationships.

The church has ordained women as ministers since 1978.

Presbyteries and chapels

Chapel names 
In the Welsh chapel tradition, chapels, rather than being dedicated to a particular saint, are named after places from the Bible. Because these place-names are written in Welsh orthography (in some cases based on the spellings used in the Authorised Version or William Morgan's Bible), and because several of the place-names are quite obscure to the interested reader, the table below identifies the referents of these dedications. Welsh words used in chapel names that have a theological meaning are also included. If a chapel name cannot be identified in the below list, it probably refers to a neighbourhood or locality within the town or village in which the chapel is located, or is an adjective such as Hen (old), Hyfrydle (delightful), Newydd (new) or Unedig (united).

Bodies to which PCW is affiliated 
Cytûn – Churches Together in Wales
Churches Together in Britain and Ireland
Conference of European Churches
World Communion of Reformed Churches
World Council of Churches

See also
 Nonconformist
 Nonconformity in Wales
 Religion in Wales
 Welsh Methodist revival

References

Bibliography
 Cross, F. L. (ed.) (1957) The Oxford Dictionary of the Christian Church. London: Oxford U. P.; p. 221-22
 Jones, David Ceri, Boyd Stanley Schlenther, and Eryn Mant White. The Elect Methodists: Calvinistic Methodism in England and Wales, 1735–1811 (University of Wales Press, 2012) 307 pages; Focuses on Griffith Jones, Thomas Haweis, Howel Harris, and George Whitefield.
 Williams, W. Welsh Calvinistic Methodism: a historical sketch. London, 1872 (third, revised edition, Bryntirion Press, 1998)
 Williams, M. W. Creative Fellowship. Caernarvon, 1935
 Davies, Gwyn (2002) A Light In The Land: a history of Christianity in Wales from 200 to 2000 AD  Bryntirion Press
 Bennett, Richard (1909) Howell Harris and the Dawn of Revival (English Translation 1962:  Banner of Truth and Evangelical Press of Wales )

Primary sources
 Rules of Discipline. Caerleon, 1821 (in Welsh)
 Confession of Faith. Aberystwyth, 1824 (in Welsh)
 The History, Rules of Discipline and Confession of the Calvinistic Methodists in Wales. London, 1825 (revised Welsh ed. 1876; English trans. 1877)
The Legal Handbook for the Calvinistic Methodist Connexion; 2nd ed. Wrexham, 1911

External links
Presbyterian Church of Wales
Calvinistic Methodist confession of faith, 1823, Creeds of Christendom website
 Two Calvinistic Methodist Chapels 1743–1811: the records of two key London chapels (the London tabernacle and Spa Fields chapel). Originally published by the London Record Society, included here on British History Online.
 Calvinistic Methodists – the page by Sean Richardson
 

1811 establishments in Wales
Members of the World Communion of Reformed Churches
Members of the World Council of Churches
Methodist denominations established in the 19th century
 
Presbyterian denominations established in the 19th century
Presbyterian denominations in Europe
Presbyterianism in Wales
Religious organizations established in 1811